USS Sturdy is a name used more than once by the United States Navy, and may refer to:

 , a patrol craft in commission from 1917 to 1919
 , formerly USS PC-460, later USS Sturdy (PYc-50), a patrol craft in commission from 1940 to 1944
 , a minesweeper in commission from 1957 to 1972

United States Navy ship names